is the terminus railway station of the Osaka Metro Yotsubashi Line in Umeda, Kita-ku, Osaka, Japan, close to Herbis OSAKA and Herbis ENT operated by Hanshin Electric Railway Co., Ltd. and the two Hilton Plazas.

Connecting lines from Nishi-Umeda

 (Umeda Station, M16)
 (Higashi-Umeda Station, T20)
 (JR West)
Tokaido Main Line (JR Kyoto Line, JR Kobe Line, JR Takarazuka Line), Osaka Loop Line (Osaka Station)
JR Tōzai Line (Kitashinchi Station)
Hankyu Railway (Umeda Station)
Kobe Line
Takarazuka Line
Kyoto Line
Hanshin Electric Railway Main Line (Umeda Station)

When using regular tickets of Osaka Metro, Surutto Kansai cards, and IC cards (PiTaPa, ICOCA), it is limited to 30 minutes to change to the Midosuji Line and the Tanimachi Line.

Layout

There is an island platform with two tracks on the third basement.  On the second basement, north ticket gate is used for exit, center ticket gate for entrance, and south ticket gate for both entrance and exit.

Surroundings

Diamor Osaka
Hanshin Department Store (operated by Hankyu Hanshin Department Stores, Inc.)
South Gate Building
Daimaru Umeda
Hotel Granvia Osaka
Pokémon Center Osaka
Osaka City Bus terminal
Expressway bus terminal
Osaka Marubiru
Osaka Garden City
Herbis OSAKA
the Ritz-Carlton Osaka
Herbis ENT
Osaka Shiki Theatre
Billboard Live Osaka
the Hilton Plaza East
Hilton Osaka
Junkudo Umeda
the Hilton Plaza West
the Mainichi Shimbun Building (the Mainichi Shimbun, Sports Nippon)
Osaka Ekimae Buildings
Osaka Central Post Office
Breezé Tower
Sankei Hall Breezé
Nippon Ham
Dojima Underground Shopping Center (Dotica)
Dojima Avanza
Junkudo Osaka

External links

 Official Site - Yotsubashi Line 
 Official Site - Yotsubashi Line

References

Railway stations in Osaka Prefecture
Railway stations in Japan opened in 1965
Osaka Metro stations
Umeda